Steve Buckley is a British jazz musician. He is a multi-instrumentalist and most often plays alto and soprano saxophones, penny whistle and bass clarinet.

Career 
Buckley was a key member of Loose Tubes. He has also been an important side man in many bands including, Human Chain, Ashley Slater's Microgroove and Django Bates' Delightful Precipice. A close connection with African and Latin American musicians led him to play and record with such bands as Bosco D'Olivera's Grupo Folia (UK), The Pan-African Orchestra (Ghana), Kakatsitsi (Ghana) and Massukos (Mozambique). One of his closest musical associations is with trumpet player Chris Batchelor. Together, they released three albums, The Whole and the Half (1995), Life As We Know It (1999) and Big Air (2008), the latter featuring Oren Marshall, Jim Black and Myra Melford. In 2006 they received the BBC Jazz on 3 award for Best New Work with Ten Tall Tales.
Buckley's main area of work has always been within the contemporary jazz scene, playing and recording with artists such as John Taylor, Julian Arguelles, Eddie Parker, Steve Noble, Billy Jenkins, Huw Warren, Christine Tobin, Colin Towns, Seb Rochford, Mike Outram, Joseph Jarman, Jonathon Joseph and Leroy Jenkins.

Discography

As leader
 The Whole and the Half with Chris Batchelor (FMR, 1995)
 Bad Gleichenberg Festival-Edition Vol. 3 with Noble/Marshall (1995)
 Bud Moon with Noble/Marshall (Ping Pong, 1996)
 Life As We Know It with Chris Batchelor (Babel, 1999)
 Big Air with Chris Batchelor (Babel, 2008)

With Loose Tubes
 Loose Tubes (Loose Tubes, 1985)
 Delightful Precipice (Loose Tubes, 1986)
 Open Letter (Editions EG, 1988)
 Dancing On Frith Street (Lost Marble, 2010)
 Sad Afrika (Lost Marble, 2012)
 Arriving (Lost Marble, 2015)

As sideman
With Django Bates
 Music for the Third Policeman (Ah Um, 1990)
 Summer Fruits (and Unrest) (JMT, 1993)
 Winter Truce (and Homes Blaze) (JMT, 1995)

With others
 Aster Aweke, Kabu (Columbia, 1991)
 Billy Jenkins, Beyond E Major (Allmusic, 1985)
 Billy Jenkins, Scratches of Spain (Thin Sliced, 1987)
 Human Chain, Cashin' in! (Editions EG, 1988)
 Marxman, Time Capsule (More Rockers 1996)
 Jeb Loy Nichols, Just What Time It Is (Trama, 2001)
 Oriole, Song for the Sleeping (F-IRE, 2004)
 Ashley Slater, Ashley Slater's Big Lounge (Plush, 2002)
 Christine Tobin, Yell of the Gazelle (Babel, 1996)
 Huw Warren, A Barrel Organ Far from Home (Babel, 1997)

Radio performances 
 Jazz On 3: Big Air. Friday 9 December 2005 23:30-1:00 Radio 3.

References 

English jazz tenor saxophonists
English jazz alto saxophonists
British male saxophonists
English jazz soprano saxophonists
English multi-instrumentalists
Crossover (music)
Tin whistle players
English bass clarinetists
Living people
21st-century saxophonists
21st-century clarinetists
21st-century British male musicians
British male jazz musicians
Year of birth missing (living people)
Loose Tubes members
Delightful Precipice members
21st-century flautists